Sagittaria macrocarpa, commonly called the large-fruited arrowhead, is an aquatic plant species known only from the US states of North Carolina and South Carolina.

References

External links
photo of herbarium specimen at Missouri Botanical Garden, holotype of Sagittaria macrocarpa, collected in South Carolina

macrocarpa
Flora of North Carolina
Flora of South Carolina
Freshwater plants
Edible plants
Plants described in 1894